Daouda Jabi (born 10 April 1981) is a Guinean former professional footballer who played as a defender.

He began his senior career with Pacy Vallée-d'Eure and USL Dunkerque before moving to RC Lens where he played for the club's reserves and the first team. He spent the 2005–06 season with AC Ajaccio. In his last two seasons he played for Turkish club Kayseri Erciyesspor and Trabzonspor respectively.

Born in Guinea Bissau, Jabi appeared in three matches at the 2006 Africa Cup of Nations finals, helping the Guinea national team reach the quarter-finals.

References

External links
Yahoo Sports

1981 births
Living people
Association football defenders
Citizens of Guinea through descent
Guinean footballers
Guinea international footballers
Bissau-Guinean footballers
Bissau-Guinean people of Guinean descent
Guinean expatriate footballers
Bissau-Guinean expatriate footballers
2006 Africa Cup of Nations players
2008 Africa Cup of Nations players
USL Dunkerque players
RC Lens players
AC Ajaccio players
Kayseri Erciyesspor footballers
Trabzonspor footballers
Ligue 1 players
Süper Lig players
Expatriate footballers in France
Guinean expatriate sportspeople in France
Expatriate footballers in Turkey